Al ajillo is a typical condiment in the cuisines of the Spanish-speaking world. The likely origin, through colonization, is the Spanish dish gambas al ajillo, prawns cooked in a garlic and hot paprika oil. In Mexico, it combines guajillo chili peppers and ajo (garlic). In other Latin American countries the dish is similar, but using other chilies, for example the aji panca or aji mirasol in Peruvian cooking, dried forms of aji amarillo.

Camarones al ajillo
It is a dish made with shrimp that are fried in a pan with butter or vegetable oil, in which slices of garlic and guajillo chile have been frying. It is seasoned with salt, black pepper, lemon and parsley or coriander.

Pescado al ajillo
It is a dish made with fish that is fried in a pan with butter or vegetable oil, in which slices of garlic and guajillo chile have been frying. It is seasoned with salt, black pepper, lemon and parsley or coriander.

References

Bibliography
 Bayless, Rick. Mexican Kitchen. (1996). .

Condiments
Mexican cuisine